Somchai Subpherm (born March 8, 1962) is a Thai football coach and former footballer.

Somchai lead Bangkok University to the league championship in 2006 and then took them on their first adventure of Asian Football in the AFC Champions League the following year.

Honours

Manager
Bangkok University F.C.
 Thailand Premier League  Champions (1) : 2006

References

External links
 

1966 births
Living people
Somchai Subpherm
Somchai Subpherm
Somchai Subpherm
Somchai Subpherm
Somchai Subpherm
Somchai Subpherm
Somchai Subpherm
Somchai Subpherm
Association football forwards
Association football midfielders
Thai expatriate sportspeople in Japan